This article contains the discography of American R&B and soul singer Lyfe Jennings.

Albums

Studio albums

Compilation albums

Singles

Solo singles

Featured singles

Guest appearances

References

Discographies of American artists
Rhythm and blues discographies
Soul music discographies